Perseverance is the official debut studio album by American rapper Percee P. It was released on Stones Throw Records on September 18, 2007. All tracks are produced by Madlib. The album features guest appearances from Guilty Simpson, Diamond D, Chali 2na, Prince Po, and Aesop Rock, among others.

Critical reception

Nate Patrin of Pitchfork gave the album a 6.5 out of 10 and praised Madlib's production, saying, "It's one of his most varied production jobs, unpredictable without being uncharacteristic, and his beats reach the perfect level of busy amplification to accompany Percee's flow." Neil Acharya of Exclaim! said, "Percee P and Madlib deserve each other and come together well in a marriage of hard rhyming and production ingenuity that has become a standard." Marisa Brown of AllMusic gave the album 4 stars out of 5, calling it "a very strong record" and "one definitely worth the wait."

PopMatters placed it at number 78 on the "101 Hip-Hop Albums of 2007" list. Rachel Swan of East Bay Express included it on the "Best Music of 2007" list.

Track listing

Personnel
Credits adapted from liner notes.

 Percee P – vocals
 Madlib – vocals (4), turntables, production, recording, mixing
 Vinnie Paz – vocals (5)
 Guilty Simpson – vocals (5)
 Diamond D – vocals (7)
 Chali 2na – vocals (10)
 Prince Po – vocals (11)
 Aesop Rock – vocals (14)
 J. Rocc – turntables (8, 11)
 Dave Cooley – recording, mixing
 Kelly Hibbert – recording, mixing, mastering
 Jeff Jank – design
 Joao Canziani – photography
 Peanut Butter Wolf – executive production
 Egon – executive production, project coordination, A&R

References

External links
 

2007 debut albums
Hip hop albums by American artists
Stones Throw Records albums
Albums produced by Madlib